Geoffrey of Durnay (French: Geoffroi de Durnay) was the Baron of Kalavryta in the Principality of Achaea. He was son of Otho of Durnay, the first Baron of Kalavryta. The Barony of Kalavryta had been lost to the Byzantines in the 1260s or early 1270s. Geoffrey received the Barony of Gritzena in compensation. He was succeeded by his son John of Durnay.

References

Sources 
 

Barons of the Principality of Achaea